Echo of the Waves (also known as Dolphin or Whale) is a sculpture by Susumu Shingu, installed outside the New England Aquarium, in Boston, Massachusetts, United States. It was completed in September 1981, and dedicated on July 6, 1983. The abstract, kinetic structure is made of painted steel and Teflon coated fiberglass, and rests on a painted steel base. It was surveyed as part of the Smithsonian Institution's "Save Outdoor Sculpture!" program in 1994.

References

1980s establishments in Massachusetts
1980s sculptures
Abstract sculptures in the United States
Dolphins in art
Fiberglass sculptures in the United States
Kinetic sculptures in the United States
Outdoor sculptures in Boston
Steel sculptures in Massachusetts
Whales in art